The Calvin Coolidge Elementary School is a former school building located at  3701 Van Buren Avenue in Flint, Michigan. It was listed on the National Register of Historic Places in 2018.

The school was constructed in 1928, with additions in 1951 and 1970. It closed its doors in 2011. In 2018, Communities First began plans to renovate the building into apartments and commercial space.

References

		
National Register of Historic Places in Genesee County, Michigan
School buildings completed in 1928
Buildings and structures in Flint, Michigan
1928 establishments in Michigan